Club Deportivo Hispano Americano is a professional basketball club based in Río Gallegos, Santa Cruz, Argentina. The club currently competes in the Liga Nacional de Básquet league.

On August 1, 2018, the club officially announced that it will compete again for the 2018–19 season under head coach Marcelo Richotti.

In 2016, Hispano Americano became the first club ever from the Santa Cruz Province to win promotion to the Liga Nacional de Básquet, Argentina's top basketball league.

Players

Current roster

Notable former players

 Sebastián Acosta
 Diego Belvedere
 Diego Ciorciari
 Larry O'Bannon

References

External links
 

Sport in Santa Cruz Province, Argentina
Basketball teams in Argentina
Basketball teams established in 1925